Greg Sharp (born 28 July 1959) is a former Australian rules footballer who played with Carlton and St Kilda in the Victorian Football League (VFL).

Notes

External links 

Greg Sharp's profile at Blueseum

1959 births
Carlton Football Club players
St Kilda Football Club players
Australian rules footballers from New South Wales
Living people